Hannah Hauxwell (1 August 192630 January 2018) was an English farmer who was the subject of several television documentaries. She first came to public attention after being covered in an ITV documentary, Too Long a Winter, made by Yorkshire Television and produced by Barry Cockcroft, which chronicled the almost unendurable conditions of farmers in the High Pennines in winter.

Yorkshire Post article

A Yorkshire Post article published in April 1970 chronicled the daily life of Hauxwell, then 44, as she worked alone in her family home, Low Birk Hatt Farm, a dilapidated  farm in Baldersdale, west of Cotherstone, in the North Riding of Yorkshire (since 1974 in County Durham).  She had run the farm by herself since the age of 35 following the deaths of her parents and uncle. With no electricity or running water and struggling to survive on £240–280 a yearat the time, the average annual salary in the UK was £1,339. Life was a constant battle against poverty and hardship, especially in the harsh Pennine winters, when she had to work outside tending her few cattle in ragged clothes in temperatures well below freezing.

Television documentaries

Too Long a Winter
In the summer of 1972, Hauxwell was discovered by a friend of a researcher at Yorkshire Television while out walking in the Yorkshire Dales. The researcher contacted Barry Cockcroft, a producer at the company, who proposed to make a TV documentary tentatively entitled The Hard Life.  The documentary started with her leading a cow into a shed during a blizzard in Baldersdale. After the documentary was first shown in 1972, Yorkshire TV's phone line was jammed for three days with viewers wanting to find out more and help her. ITV received hundreds of phone calls and mail containing gifts and money for "the old lady in the Yorkshire Dales". A local factory raised money to fund getting electricity to Low Birk Hatt Farm, and she continued to receive thousands of letters and donations from well-wishers around the world.

A Winter Too Many

Almost two decades after Too Long a Winter, in 1989, the same TV crew returned to her farm to catch up with Hauxwell. The second documentary, A Winter Too Many, saw that Hauxwell had a little more money, which she had invested in a few more cows.  The crew followed her to London where she was guest of honour at the Women of the Year gala.  Out of the spotlight, however, her work on the farm continued, and each winter became harder for her to endure. She commented "In summer I live and in winter I exist" in the film, which also showed her departure just before Christmas 1988. With her health and strength slowly failing, she had to sell her family farm and the animals she adored and move into a warm cottage in a nearby village.

Hannah Goes To Town
The footage of Hauxwell's journey to the Women of the Year gala at the London Savoy Hotel as a guest of honour, where she met the Duchess of Gloucesterwhich was briefly touched upon in A Winter Too Manywas used alongside additional footage (collected at the time) to document Hauxwell's entire trip.

Hannah Hauxwell: Innocent Abroad
In 1992 director Barry Cockcroft once again ventured into Hauxwell's life making a documentary series which followed Hauxwell on her first trips outside of the UK. Hauxwell visited France, Germany, Austria, Switzerland and Italy, during which she met the Pope.  The series proved so popular it was followed by another trip, this time to the United States in 1993, filmed as Hannah:USA.

Later life

A book, Hannah Hauxwell—80 Years in the Dales (W. R. Mitchell) was published in 2008. A new DVD, Hannah Hauxwell—An Extraordinary Life, featuring Too Long A Winter, A Winter Too Many, and Innocent Abroad, was published. Hauxwell was interviewed on Woman's Hour in March 2008. To mark her 85th year, she was interviewed by the Yorkshire Post and revealed that she was still living a frugal life and remained an avid radio listener.

She moved to a care home in Barnard Castle in 2016, and to a nursing home in West Auckland the following year. She died there on 30 January 2018. After a funeral service at Barnard Castle Methodist Church, Hauxwell was laid to rest at Romaldkirk cemetery, not far from Low Birk Hatt.

References

1926 births
2018 deaths
People from Startforth Rural District
20th-century English farmers
British documentary television series
People from County Durham (before 1974)
English Methodists
21st-century English farmers